Théâtre des Cérémonies was a temporary stadium in Albertville, France.  Built to only host the opening and closing ceremonies for the 1992 Winter Olympics, the circular shape stadium was immediately disassembled following the games.  The stadium held 35,000 and was built as a circus sphere. Part of the stadium was shipped to Barcelona and used during the 1992 Summer Olympics.  During its existence, it was the largest such temporary structure ever built. The site is now a park.

References
1992 Winter Olympics official report. pp. 86–7.

External links
: Image from the International Olympic Committee about the 1992 Winter Games. Includes images of the "Théâtre des Cérémonies".

1992 Winter Olympics
Venues of the 1992 Winter Olympics
Sports venues in Savoie
Olympic stadiums
Sports venues completed in 1991
Sports venues demolished in 1992
Defunct sports venues in France
Demolished buildings and structures in France
1991 establishments in France